Abram Garfield (November 21, 1872 – October 16, 1958) was the youngest son of President James A. Garfield and Lucretia Rudolph Garfield, and an architect who practiced in Cleveland, Ohio.

Biography
Garfield received a Bachelor of Arts from Williams College in 1893 and a Bachelor of Science in architecture from the Massachusetts Institute of Technology three years later.  Beginning his architectural practice in 1897, in 1898 he formed Meade & Garfield with Frank Meade to form the architectural firm Meade & Garfield in Cleveland, Ohio; the firm was noted for its premier residential designs.  When the partnership ended in 1905, Garfield opened his own firm until 1926 when he along with Rudolph Stanley-Brown, George R. Harris, and Alexander Robinson started an architectural practice. In 1935 it was renamed Garfield, Harris, Robinson and Schafer until Garfield’s death in 1958. The firm, which still exists, was known as Westlake, Reed, Leskosky Architects until 2016 when purchased by DLR group. Garfield specialized in residential architecture, designing large houses in Shaker Heights and other Cleveland suburbs, but his work also included more modest houses for the Cleveland Metropolitan Housing Authority and institutional projects such as schools and a hospital.  Garfield served as chairman of the Cleveland Planning Commission from 1930 to 1942 and was a founder and first president of the Cleveland School of Architecture, which became part of Western Reserve University in 1941. He was named a trustee of the university that year and two years later was made an honorary lifetime member of the board; he received an honorary doctorate from Western Reserve University in 1945.  Garfield was also a director of the American Institute of Architects from 1919 to 1922 and served on the U.S. Commission of Fine Arts from 1925 to 1930, including as vice chairman from 1929 to 1930. In 1949 he was elected into the National Academy of Design as an Associate Academician. He lived in Bratenahl, Ohio. Garfield married Helen Matthews and together they had two children, Edward W. and Mrs. William R. Hallaran. Garfield died on October 16, 1958 at his home in Cleveland. He was buried at Lake View Cemetery in Cleveland.

Works

A number of his works are listed on the National Register of Historic Places.

Garfield's works include:
Casa Apava, an estate built in 1918 for Chester C. Bolton and Frances P. Bolton on Ocean Boulevard in Palm Beach, Florida.  After Ron Perelman sold this house and two adjoining properties to Dwight Schar in 2004 for a reported $70 million ($45 million for the house), Forbes magazine described this as "the most expensive home ever sold in the U.S." It was sold for $71.2 million in 2015.
Elizabeth B. and Dudley S. Blossom Estate Service Compound, 24449 Cedar Rd. Lyndhurst, Ohio (Garfield, Abram), NRHP-listed
Faxon-Thomas Mansion, now the Hunter Museum of American Art, 10 Bluff View Ave. Chattanooga, Tennessee (Garfield, Abram), NRHP-listed
Garfield Library, 7300 Center St. Mentor, Ohio (Garfield, Abram), NRHP-listed
The Hangar, 24400 Cedar Rd. Beachwood, Ohio (Garfield, Abram), NRHP-listed
The College Club of Cleveland/Alexander House, 2348 Overlook Rd., Cleveland Heights, Ohio built 1904. 
Hay-McKinney and Bingham-Hanna House, now the Western Reserve Historical Society, 10825 East Blvd. Cleveland, Ohio (Garfield, Abram), NRHP-listed
Jared A. Smith  House, 2541 Kenilworth Rd., Cleveland Heights, Ohio built 1898.
John G. Oliver House, 7645 Little Mountain Rd. Mentor, Ohio (Garfield, Abram), NRHP-listed
Leonard Hall, a dormitory at Kenyon College. Built in 1924.
Mather House at Case Western Reserve University, built 1913-1915
W.H. Warner House. 2689 East Overlook Rd, Cleveland Heights, Ohio. Built 1898. Notable for French Chateaux-inspired Circular Staircase and ornate chimneys.
Jerome Zerbe-Samuel Halle (of Halle Brothers Co.) House. 2163 Harcourt Drive, Cleveland Heights Ohio. Built 1905.

References

External links

Howard Babcock, "Garfield's Son Recalls Tragedy", Central Press Association in Kentucky New Era, August 8, 1957, p. 18.

1872 births
1958 deaths
Architects from Cleveland
Abram
Children of presidents of the United States
Williams College alumni
MIT School of Architecture and Planning alumni
Burials at Lake View Cemetery, Cleveland
People from Bratenahl, Ohio